or  were large Japanese warships of the 16th and 17th century used during the internecine Japanese wars for political control and unity of all Japan.

History
Japan undertook major naval building efforts in the mid to late 16th century, during the Sengoku period, when feudal rulers vying for supremacy built vast coastal navies of several hundreds of ships. The largest (and generally most dangerous) of these ships were called atakebune. These vessels may be regarded as floating fortresses rather than true warships, and were only used in coastal actions. They used oars for propulsion, as their full iron cladding, if it existed, as well as their bulk (i.e. the armament and people they were carrying) likely impeded wind propulsion via sails.

Around that time, the Japanese daimyō Oda Nobunaga had made, according to the diary of the Abbot of the Tamon-I, six iron-covered big atakebunes in 1578. These ships were called "Tekkōsen" (鉄甲船), literally meaning "iron ships", which is not to imply they were of iron, but that their superstructure may have been reinforced with iron plates against cannon and fire arrows. No iron covering was mentioned in the account of the Jesuit missionary Luís Fróis, who had also seen and described the ships.

However, in the letter from João Rodrigues to Luís Fróis in 1593, full iron-covered atakebune built by Toyotomi Hideyoshi were mentioned. Hideyoshi made those ships to invade Korea and their superstructure was fully covered by iron plates. 

The atakebune were armed with four at most (six if there were two smaller breech-loading swivel guns) cannons and numerous large-caliber arquebuses because it lacked the strength to withstand the recoil of cannon. The Oda defeated the Mori's navy with them at the mouth of the Kizu River, Osaka in 1578 in a successful naval blockade. These ships, the best of the atakebune, were used somewhat in contrast to Japanese naval tactics of the time, which viewed naval combat as a battle between the crews of ships, rather than between the ships themselves (which contributed to the primary Japanese naval tactic of drawing near and boarding opposing ships, as the Japanese crews excelled at hand-to-hand combat).

In the Japanese invasion of Korea the shortcomings of these ships became pronounced as they proved to be of no match to the superior build and fire power of the Korean navy's Panokseon ships, which could accommodate far more number of cannons due to sturdier structure and thus were employed in a distance engagement by cannon tactics rather than the grappling tactics of the atakebune-based Japanese navy.

"Atakemaru" (安宅丸), the big atakebune made by Mukai Shōgen Tadakatsu for Tokugawa Hidetada and Tokugawa Iemitsu was fully covered by copper plates.

See also
Ohama Kagetaka, a pirate who used an atakebune
Turtle Ship, a Korean ship with similar armor plating
Djong, large ship with thick hull, which lower the effectiveness of artillery

References

Naval ships of Japan
16th-century ships